The Incredible Petrified World is a 1959 science fiction film produced and directed by Jerry Warren, and starring John Carradine and Robert Clarke. The film follows four explorers who travel down into the depths of the sea and get stranded in an underwater cavern.

The film was completed by Warren in 1957, but remained unreleased until it was distributed starting in November 1959 and, more widely, in April 1960 on a double feature with Warren's  Teenage Zombies.

Plot
Professor Millard Wyman (John Carradine) sends a crew of two men, Paul Whitmore (Allen Windsor) and Craig Randall (Robert Clarke), and two women Lauri Talbott (Sheila Noonan) and Dale Marshall (Phyllis Coates), down to ocean depths never before explored.  But, there's a technical problem during the launch. The diving bell breaks free of the cable connecting them to the surface and loses contact with the surface. The mission is believed lost.

But the crew, having survived their ordeal, don their scuba gear and leave the bell.  Instead of reaching the surface, they surface in a cavern.  The crew members explore the cave and find a skeleton, then a disheveled old sailor named Matheny (George Skaff) who tells them that he and another sailor suffered a shipwreck fourteen years prior and has been living in these caves ever since. He claims there is no way out and a volcano provides air from the surface.

Meanwhile, up on the surface Prof. Wyman's younger brother builds another bell and launches it in an attempted rescue mission.  However, with the old man in the cave starting to leer lecherously at the women, and the volcano growing more unstable, the second mission may not find them in time. The old man reveals to the women that he murdered the other sailor years ago, increasing their apprehension. Just as he is about to assault one of the girls, the volcano erupts and the old man is crushed under falling rocks. The stranded crew of the diving bell make their way up toward the surface and are rescued.

Cast

 John Carradine as Dr. Millard Wyman
 Robert Clarke as Craig Randall
 Allen Windsor as Paul Whitmore
 Phyllis Coates as Dale Marshall
 George Skaff as Metheny, the crazy old sailor
 Lloyd Nelson as Wilson - Sonar man
 Sheila Noonan (aka Sheila Carol) as Lauri Talbott
 Maurice Bernard
 Joe Maierhauser as Jim Wyman - Brother
 Harry Raven as Captain
 Jack Haffner as Jimmy - Reporter
 Jerry Warren (director cameo) man on the plane
 Milt Collion as Hank
 Robert Carroll

Production
In an interview, star Robert Clarke said that the cinematographer was a well-known Hollywood cameraman who used the pseudonym "Victor Fisher" to avoid trouble with the union for taking a job on a non-union picture. The cavern sequences were shot at Colossal Cave in Tucson, Arizona. Phyllis Coates was never paid for her performance.

Warren had a monster suit built to use in the film, but "it ended up looking too bad even for Warren", so the suit was scrapped. The ad line retained the mention of the monster however, stating "A Nightmare of Terror in the Center of the Earth with Forgotten Men, Monsters, Earthquakes and Boiling Volcanos!"

Release
The film was completed around March 1957. It remained unreleased for two-and-a-half years until it was put on the bottom of a double feature with another of Warren's films, Teenage Zombies, first showing on November 12, 1959, later released on April 16, 1960.

Reception
Thomas Reddy in the Los Angeles Examiner commented "In a film of this type, you'd expect a monster or two. But no, not one teensy-weensy monster. The closest thing to it is a bearded bum found living in the cavern....it's incredible that for more than a hour, nothing the least bit exciting happens." The film opens with some stock footage showing a shark battling, and tearing apart, an octopus (perhaps these were the monsters spoken of in the ad line).

Bill Warren said "The film is so uneventful that it's puzzling as to why it was ever made....it has no possible reason for existence....there is at least one zombie in Teenage Zombies". He goes on to state "The film may have taken an entire week to shoot, and Carradine probably did all his work in one day."

See also
 List of American films of 1959
 List of films in the public domain in the United States

References

External links

 
 
 
 

1960 films
1960 independent films
1960s science fiction adventure films
American black-and-white films
American science fiction adventure films
American independent films
Films directed by Jerry Warren
Science fiction submarine films
Films set in subterranea
1960s English-language films
1950s English-language films
1950s American films
1960s American films